Maxime Mermoz (born 28 July 1986) is a French former professional rugby union footballer.

Mermoz won the 2006 Under 21 Rugby World Championship. He earned his first cap for the senior France national team on 5 July 2008 against Australia. He made his Six Nations Championship debut in the 2009 Six Nations Championship against Scotland. Mermoz scored his first try for France in their 37-17 loss to New Zealand at the 2011 Rugby World Cup, he intercepted a Dan Carter pass close to the half-way line before running clear to score. In May 2013 he was an unused replacement as Toulon won the 2013 Heineken Cup Final by 16–15 against Clermont Auvergne.

In January 2017, he signed a short-term deal for English side, Leicester Tigers as an injury cover for Matt To'omua and Manu Tuilagi who were sidelined for the rest of the season. He made his debut against Gloucester off the bench coming in for Matt Smith in the 51st minute and he scored his first try 30 minutes later.

In February 2017, he signed for another English club, Newcastle Falcons and would join them at the end of the current season.

International tries

Honours
Toulouse
Top 14 (1): 2007–08

Perpignan
Top 14 (1): 2008–09

Toulon
Heineken Cup (3): 2012–13, 2013–14, 2014–15
Top 14 (1): 2013–14

France U21
Under 21 Rugby World Championship (1): 2006

References

1986 births
Living people
Sportspeople from Épinal
French rugby union players
France international rugby union players
Stade Toulousain players
USA Perpignan players
RC Toulonnais players
Leicester Tigers players
Newcastle Falcons players
French sportspeople of Algerian descent
Rugby union centres